This is a List of Portuguese football transfers winter 2012. The winter transfer window opened on 1 January 2012 and closed at midnight on 31 January 2012. Transfers for players may happen after the deadline due to other international leagues having different transfer window systems of when they close. Only moves involving Primeira Liga clubs are listed. Players without a club may join a club at any time, either during or in between transfer windows.

Transfers

 Player who signed with club before 1 January officially joined his new club on 1 January 2012, while player who joined after 1 January joined his new club following his signature of the contract.

References

External links
Primeira Liga Transfers

2011–12 in Portuguese football
Football transfers winter 2011–12
Lists of Portuguese football transfers